The 2000 Australian Sports Sedan Championship was a CAMS sanctioned Australian motor racing title for drivers of Sports Sedans. The title, which was the sixteenth Australian Sports Sedan Championship, was won by Kerry Baily, driving a Nissan 300ZX.

Calendar
The championship was contested over a five-round series.

Championship results

References

External links
 Image of the Nissan 300ZX of Kerry Baily
 Race reports for Round 4 of the 2000 ASSC

National Sports Sedan Series
Sports Sedan Championship